Niko Vakararawa is a Fijian rugby league footballer who represented Fiji in the 2000 World Cup.

Playing career
Vakararawa played in the Group 1 Rugby League competition, with the Lismore Marist Brothers Rams. In 2005 the competition merged, becoming the Northern Rivers Regional Rugby League competition.

In 2012, after two years off, he returned to the sport, re-joining the Lismore Marist Brothers club. Later that year he was named in the Northern Rivers representative side.

References

Living people
Fijian rugby league players
Fiji national rugby league team players
Rugby league wingers
Rugby league centres
I-Taukei Fijian people
Year of birth missing (living people)